Christian Sarnow (March 25, 1837 - January 24, 1906) was a member of the Wisconsin State Assembly.

Biography
Sarnow was born on March 25, 1837. During the American Civil War, he was an officer with the 1st Wisconsin Infantry Regiment (3 Months) and the 26th Wisconsin Infantry Regiment of the Union Army.

Political career
Sarnow was a member of the Assembly in 1877 and 1879. Previously, he had been an alderman of Milwaukee, Wisconsin. He was a Republican.

References

Politicians from Milwaukee
Republican Party members of the Wisconsin State Assembly
Wisconsin city council members
People of Wisconsin in the American Civil War
Union Army officers
1837 births
1906 deaths
19th-century American politicians